Hontoon Island State Park is a  Florida State Park located on Hontoon Island between the St. Johns River and the Hontoon Dead River in Volusia County. It is six miles (10 km) west of DeLand, off SR 44, and can only be reached by boat or park-operated passenger ferry. No motorized vehicles, other than wheelchairs, are allowed to be brought onto the island and there is no swimming. The island has pine flatwoods, palm and oak hammocks, bald cypress swamps and marshes. Hontoon Island is surrounded by the St. Johns River, the Hontoon Dead River, and Snake Creek.

Activities include horseshoes, cycling, boating, canoeing, kayaking, and fishing, as well as hiking, camping, picnicking, and nature viewing and photography. The island can be circumnavigated with a nine and a half-mile (14 km) day trip; Blue Spring State Park is a short paddle up the St. Johns (3.5 miles) one way.  Amenities include canoe rentals, bike paths, eleven tent sites and six rustic cabins. The park also has overnight boat slip rentals, playground equipment, picnic tables, and a  nature trail. The park has a lending library with picture books for children aged four to nine. The park is open from 8:00 am till one hour before sunset year-round.

Rentals
Bicycle rentals are $6 per hour or $15 all day.
Canoe and kayak rentals are $20 for up to four hours and $40 all day.
All rentals must be returned by 5 p.m. There are no refunds for inclement weather.
Tent sites and marina slips rent for $18 per night.
Four-person cabins rent for $30 per night and six-person cabins rent for $35 per night.

The Mayacan Indians were the first inhabitants of Hontoon Island. Evidence of their presence can be seen by a large shell mound that still exist at the end of the Hammock Trail, 1.7 miles one way, on what is mostly a shaded hike.

Wildlife gallery

References

External links
 Hontoon Island State Park Podcast by RICHES
 Hontoon Island State Park at Florida State Parks
 Hontoon Island State Park at State Parks
 Hontoon Island State Park at Absolutely Florida
 Hontoon Island State Park at Wildernet

Parks in Volusia County, Florida
State parks of Florida
Florida Native American Heritage Trail
DeLand, Florida